The Rundle Cup is a rugby trophy contested between the West Coast and Buller rugby unions.  It replaced the Molloy Cup.  Of the 37 challenge trophies contested by two provinces in New Zealand rugby it is of the longest continuous existence, it is also the second oldest provincial trophy after the Ranfurly Shield.

Origins 
The Rundle Cup was donated to the West Coast provincial union during their Annual General Meeting at the Albion Hotel on 24 May 1911 by William Rundle as a trophy for Buller-West Coast matches.  Rundle was a local business man in the mining industry and former player for the Grey Football Club.  He later perished on the frontline in France during World War One.  The first contest for the cup was held in 1911 in Westport and was won by Buller.

Former Holders

Current Holders 
Buller are the current holders of the Rundle Cup after beating West Coast 36-32 at John Sturgeon Park, Greymouth on September 12th, 2022.

Next Match 
The next fixture for the Rundle Cup is uncertain as, as both teams can be placed in different sides of the draw in the Heartland Championship

References 

New Zealand rugby union competitions